Heart of the Lion is a 2008 Burkinabé film.

Synopsis
A lion causes ravages among the livestock. Several people disappear. Seeing the village chief is doing nothing, a young shepherd, Samba, decides to follow the lion's tracks on his own. But not just anyone can hunt a lion and Samba is trapped by it. Despite his courage, the lion almost kills him. Luckily, a young hunter appears and kills the animal. Samba's life is saved, but not his honor. He wants to take the lion's tale back to the village, but Tanko won't let him. The trophy is his. The lion is dead, yet people keep on disappearing.

Prizes
 FESPACO 2009

External links

 

2008 films
Burkinabé drama films
2000s French-language films
Films about lions
Films about missing people